Anne T. Hill (November 24, 1916 – March 8, 1999) was an American fashion designer and yoga teacher.

Early years
Hill was born in Atlanta, Georgia. She graduated from Commercial High School in 1933, attended the University of Georgia, and worked as a stenographer before moving to Los Angeles in 1937.

Taffy Fashions
Hill designed dresses, predominantly cotton, for her own line, Taffy, from 1937 until March 1958. As women’s fashions took up a larger budget slice, the popularity of her dresses grew. They were featured as “outstanding” in a Palm Springs Tennis Club fashion luncheon in 1948. Vogue and Harper’s Bazaar carried full page ads for Taffy fashions during the 1950s, and covered Taffy fashions editorially. “There is nothing so feminine and romantic as a full skirt, pretty, with petticoats underneath,” Hill told Women’s Wear Daily. "The very feminine dresses almost all have bouffant skirts built over their own petticoats," wrote Eugenia Trinkle, Fashion Writer for the Star Telegram. Bergdorf Goodman, Garfinckel's, and Jacobson's carried Taffy fashions.

Health and yoga
Through an acquaintance with Gypsy Boots, Hill became interested in health food and yoga. She studied yoga with Indra Devi, and produced her own yoga instructional video, as well as an inspirational poem.

Death
Hill died in Rancho Mirage, California, in 1999.

Gallery

References

External links
 

1916 births
1999 deaths
Artists from Palm Springs, California
Artists from Atlanta
American yoga teachers
Culture of Los Angeles
American fashion designers
American women fashion designers
Clothing brands
Women yogis
20th-century American women
20th-century American people
University of Georgia alumni